Roger Madruga (born 1964 in Rio de Janeiro) is a former international freestyle swimmer from Brazil. He is the younger brother of Djan Madruga.

International career

He was at the 1979 Pan American Games, in San Juan, where he finished 12th in the 400-metre individual medley, and 16th in the 400-metre freestyle and in the 1500-metre freestyle.

Participated at the 1982 World Aquatics Championships in Guayaquil, where he finished 8th in the 400-metre individual medley final, and 17th in the 1500-metre freestyle. The conditions were adverse in Ecuador. Ricardo Prado gave a statement to a Brazilian newspaper, telling the situation: "The hotel we stayed at was not well attended. It was directly across the Guayaquil bus station. I managed to reach the final of the 200-metre individual medley, but I was weak because food there was terrible, and finished the race in eighth place." Prado landed at home with gold in the neck and a big mycosis in the belly. Djan Madruga had worse luck: he contracted typhoid.

At the 1983 Summer Universiade, in Edmonton, he finished 6th in the 400-metre individual medley.

He was at the 1983 Pan American Games, in Caracas, where he finished 5th in the 400-metre individual medley, and 8th in the 1500-metre freestyle.

He was champion of the Big Ten Conference on 1982 (400-metre individual medley - 3:57:27) and 1983 (400-metre individual medley - 3:55:34).

References

1964 births
Living people
Brazilian male freestyle swimmers
Pan American Games competitors for Brazil
Swimmers at the 1979 Pan American Games
Swimmers at the 1983 Pan American Games
Swimmers from Rio de Janeiro (city)
20th-century Brazilian people